Gooom Disques, or Gooom, was an electronic music record label based in Paris, France. Gooom was founded by Jean-Philippe Talaga in 1997 after interviewing the British post-rock act Stereolab for his fanzine and both parties agreeing to release music. As a result, the first release on the label was a split EP by Stereolab and Fugu.

The label gained exposure outside France with the popularity of the artist M83. Since 2005 the label is dormant.

Artists
 Abstrackt Keal Agram
 Anne Laplantine
 Cosmodrome
 Cyann & Ben
 Gel: Dorine-Muraille
 KG
 Kids Indestructible
 M83
 Mils
 Montag
 Purple Confusion

References

External links
 
 

French record labels
Electronic music record labels
Record labels established in 1997